The Collège Saint-Servais is a Catholic school in Liège (Belgium). Founded in 1828, it revived the educational tradition of the suppressed Collège en Isle. When it became co-educational in 1992, it was renamed the Collège Saint-Benoît Saint-Servais. The pedagogy of the collège is Jesuit, as based on their Ratio studiorum, although most of the teachers are now lay-people.

See also
 List of Jesuit sites in Belgium
 Diocese of Liège

Jesuit secondary schools in Belgium
Education in Liège
Buildings and structures in Liège
1820s establishments in the Southern Netherlands
Educational institutions established in 1828
Secondary schools in Belgium
1828 establishments in the Netherlands